Bernd Schroeder (born 6 June 1944) is a German writer who authored books, television plays, film scripts and audio plays.

Life 
Schroeder was born in Aussig, Reichsgau Sudetenland), when his parents fled during World War II. He grew up in Fürholzen near Neufahrn, Upper Bavaria. He studied at the University of Munich.

He has written film scripts since 1968, including for Wolfgang Petersen. He directed audio plays, both his own and of others. In 1992, he received the German Film Award. He wrote novels from 1993. Schroeder is a member of the PEN Centre Germany.

Bernd Schroeder married Elke Heidenreich in 1972. They collaborated on audio plays in the 1970s, and wrote books together after they separated in 1995, Rudernde Hunde in 2002, and Alte Liebe in 2009. They are the speakers in an audio play after Alte Liebe.

Works

Books 
 Konstantin Wecker. Gesprächs-Collage. Bertelsmann, 1982.
 with Paul Breitner: Kopfball. Ullstein, 1982.
 with Hanns Dieter Hüsch: Hanns Dieter Hüsch hat jetzt zugegeben… (Eine Collage). Arche Verlag, 1985, .
 Versunkenes Land : ein Roman. 1993.
 Unter Brüdern. 1995.
 Handwerken. Kleine Philosophie der Passionen. 1999.
 Die Madonnina. 2001.
 with Elke Heidenreich: Rudernde Hunde. 2002.
 Mutter & Sohn : Erzählung. 2004.
 with Reinhard Mey: Was ich noch zu sagen hätte. Kiepenheuer & Witsch 2005.
 Hau. 2006.
 mit Dieter Hildebrandt: Ich mußte immer lachen. Kiepenheuer & Witsch 2006.
 with Elke Heidenreich: Alte Liebe. Hanser 2009, .
 Auf Amerika. Roman. Hanser, München 2012, . (Fischer Taschenbuch, Frankfurt am Main 2014)
 Wir sind doch alle da. Hanser, München 2013.
 Warten auf Goebbels. Hanser, München 2017.
Von Apfelgrün bis Zölibat. Dittrich-Verlag 2017.

Screenplays 
 8051 Grinning, 1972, TV film, directed by Peter Beauvais
 Sittengemälde, 1973, TV film, directed by Eberhard Itzenplitz
 Nestwärme, 1973, TV film, directed by Eberhard Itzenplitz
 Münchner Gschichtn, 1974, TV series, 2 episodes, directed by Herbert Vesely
 Münchnerinnen, 1975, TV film, directed by Eberhard Itzenplitz
 , 1975, TV film, directed by Wolfgang Petersen
 Hahnenkampf, 1975, TV film, directed by Lutz Büscher
 Die Herausforderung, 1975, TV film, directed by Michael Verhoeven
 Hans im Glück, 1976, TV film, directed by Wolfgang Petersen
 , 1977, directed by Michael Verhoeven
 Notwehr, 1977, TV film, directed by Hartmut Griesmayr
 Menschenfresser, 1977, TV film, directed by Rainer Boldt
 Bier und Spiele, 1978, TV series of 14 episodes, directed by Michael Verhoeven
 Qualverwandtschaften, 1982, TV film, directed by Ulrich Heising
 Kein schöner Land, 1982, TV series of 6 episodes, directed by Klaus Emmerich
 Glückspilze, 1984, TV series, 2 episodes, directed by Bernd Schroeder
 , 1985, TV miniseries, directed by Wolfgang Staudte and Hans‑Werner Schmidt
 Preisausschreiben, 1985, TV film, directed by Bernd Schroeder
 Da Capo, 1986, TV film, directed by Bernd Schroeder
 Fraulein, 1986, TV film, directed by Michael Haneke
 Dreifacher Rittberger, 1987, TV series in 5 episodes, book by Elke Heidenreich, directed by Bernd Schroeder
 , 1991, directed by Klaus Emmerich

Audio plays 
 Kreuzerlschreiber, 1969, directed by Hellmuth Kirchammer
 Zwischenbilanz, 1970, directed by Edmund Steinberger
 Miteinander-Füreinander, 1971, directed by Alexander Malachowsky
 Die Geburtstag der Gaby Hambacher, 1971, directed by Wolf Euba
 Hans, 1975, directed by Schroeder
 Rentenheirat, 1977, directed by Schroeder
 Alte Bäume, 1977–80, series of 12 short audio plays, directed by Otto Düben et.al.
 Versunkenes Land, 1995, in two parts, directed by Schroeder
 Wasser für Bayern, 1996–2000, series in 14 episodes, directed by Schroeder
 Unter Brüdern, 1999, in two parts, directed by Schroeder

Unrealised film scripts 
 Die Madonnina, 2010
 Alte Liebe, 2013

Plays 
 Sennentuntschi, 1973, arranged for the stage for Kammerspiele München
 Kater Lampe; 1979, arranged for the stage for Freie Volksbühne Berlin
 General Mutter, 2013

References

External links 
 
 
 Hau (two chapters, read by the author) literaturport.de

German screenwriters
German male screenwriters
German television writers
German Film Award winners
1944 births
Living people
People from Sudetenland
Writers from Ústí nad Labem